Zsolt Madarasz (born 1 December 1959) is a Swiss fencer. He competed in the team épée event at the 1988 Summer Olympics.

References

External links
 

1959 births
Living people
Swiss male fencers
Olympic fencers of Switzerland
Fencers at the 1988 Summer Olympics
Swiss people of Hungarian descent